Guido Pieters (born 1948 in Maastricht) is a Dutch film director. After directing various large Dutch movie projects and successful TV series during the 1980s and early 1990s, Pieters became a productive director in the German TV world.

His films include:
Ciske de Rat
Op Hoop van Zegen
Het Woeden der Gehele Wereld

External links
 

1948 births
Living people
Dutch film directors
People from Maastricht